The High Commissioner to India is New Zealand's foremost diplomatic representative in India, and in charge of New Zealand's diplomatic mission in India. As fellow members of the Commonwealth of Nations, they exchange diplomatic relations in governmental level rather than  through Heads of state. Thus the countries exchange High Commissioners, rather than ambassadors.

The High Commission is located in New Delhi, India's capital city.  New Zealand has maintained a resident High Commissioner in India since 1970, except for a period from 1982 until 1985. The High Commissioner to India is concurrently accredited to Bangladesh, Nepal, and Sri Lanka.

List of heads of mission

High Commissioners to India
Resident HCs

 Bill Challis (1958–1960)
 Sir Guy Powles (1960–1963)
 Fred de Malmanche (1963–1965)
 James Esmond Farrell (1965–1968)
 Brian Lendrum (1968–1971)
Post vacant (1971–1972)
 Rex Cunninghame (1972–1975)
 Colin Aikman (1975–1979)
 Don Harper (1979–1981)
 Barry Brooks (1981–1982)

Non-resident High Commissioners, resident in Wellington
 Barry Brooks (1982–1983)
 David McDowell (1983–1985)

Resident HCs
 Sir Edmund Hillary  (1985–1989)
 Priscilla Williams (1989–1993)
 Nick Bridge (1993–1997)
 Adrian Simcock (1997–2001)
 Caroline McDonald (2001–2004)
 Graeme Waters (2004–2007)
 Rupert Holborow (2007–2011)
 Jan Henderson (2011–2014)
 Grahame Morton (2014–2017)
 Joanna Kempkers (2017–2020)
 David Pine (2020-Present)

Footnotes

References
 

India, High Commissioners from New Zealand to
New Zealand